Relational Investors is an activist investment fund based in San Diego, California. Founded in 1996 by Ralph V. Whitworth, the fund has $6 Billion in assets under management. The firm primarily invests in value stocks of companies with market capitalization of over $5 billion while charging a 1% management fee and a 20% incentive fee on returns above the S&P 500.

The fund tends to invest in specific target companies with the intent of exerting influence on management while getting its own board members elected. Typically, the fund looks for businesses with strong fundamentals and cash flows but are trading below their intrinsic value due to improper management.

Investment Strategy 

Typically, Relational initiates a small stake in a target company of around $100 million. Then a request of audience is made to management and directors with a list of proposals to boost shareholder value.

If the target company is receptive, Relational will build its position to 5% to 10% of the equity. If the company rejects Relational's advances, however, the firm typically will act on the threat of mounting a proxy fight and going public with its proposals.

The Fund typically pushes for large buybacks and dividends to shareholders.

External links
 Relational Investors Official website
 Business Week company profile
 LinkedIn company profile

Financial services companies of the United States